This is a comprehensive list of major music awards received by A-ha, a Norwegian new wave band. Formed in 1982 by Morten Harket, Magne Furuholmen, and Paul Waaktaar-Savoy, A-ha have been one of the most popular European acts in the world since the mid-1980s. The band has sold more than 100 million albums and singles worldwide, and has been nominated for one Grammy Award, more than any other Norwegian rock band.

A-ha achieved mainstream success with their debut album Hunting High and Low and the single "Take On Me" in 1985. After the release of the album A-ha was nominated for Best New Artist. In 1994, the band went on a hiatus. After a performance at the Nobel Peace Prize Concert in 1998, the band returned to the studio and recorded 2000's Minor Earth Major Sky, which resulted in a new started to work on their new album. In 2002 the band released their seventh studio album Lifelines. Analogue was released in 2005 and has been certified Silver. Their 2009 album "Foot of the Mountain"  is their highest charting album in the U.K. since 1988's "Stay on These Roads".

Royal Norwegian Order of St. Olav
The three members of a-ha, Morten Harket, Magne Furuholmen and Paul Waaktaar Savoy, was appointed Knights of the 1st Class of the Royal Norwegian Order of St. Olav for their contribution to Norwegian music. The Royal Norwegian Order of St. Olav is granted as a reward for distinguished services to their country and mankind. The official ceremony took place on 6 November 2012.

Awards and nominations
{| class="wikitable sortable plainrowheaders" 
|-
! scope="col" | Award
! scope="col" | Year
! scope="col" | Nominee(s)
! scope="col" | Category
! scope="col" | Result
! scope="col" class="unsortable"| 
|-
! scope="row"|American Music Awards
| 1986
| "Take On Me"
| Favorite Pop/Rock Video
| 
| 
|-
!scope="row" rowspan=4|BMI London Awards
| 1991
| rowspan=4|"Take On Me"
| 1 Million Award
| 
|-
| 2007
| 3 Million Award
| 
| rowspan=2|
|-
| 2013
| 4 Million Award
| 
|-
| 2020
| 7 Million Award
| 
| 
|-
!scope="row" rowspan=4|Billboard Music Awards
| rowspan=3|1985
| rowspan=2|Themselves
| Top Pop Singles Artist
| 
| rowspan=3|
|-
| Top Pop Singles Artist - Duo/Group
| 
|-
| "Take On Me"
| Top Pop Single
| 
|-
| 1986
| "The Sun Always Shines on T.V."
| Top Dance Sales Single
| 
| 
|-
!scope="row" rowspan=4|Bravo Otto Awards
| 1985 || rowspan=4|Themselves || Band: Bronze Award ||  
| 
|-
| 1986 || rowspan=2|Rock Group: Gold Award ||  
| 
|-
| 1987 ||  
| 
|-
| 1988 || Rock Group: Silver Award ||  
| 
|-
! scope="row"|Brit Awards
| 1987
| Themselves
| International Group
| 
| 
|-
! scope="row"|Gammleng Awards
| 2008
| Themselves
| Pop Music 
| 
|
|-
! scope="row" rowspan=1|Grammy Awards
| rowspan="1" | 1986
| Themselves
| Best New Artist
| 
| 
|-
! scope="row"|Guinness World Records
| 1991
| Themselves
| Largest Paying Audience 
| 
| 
|-
! scope="row"|Hungarian Music Awards
| 2010
| Foot of the Mountain
| Best Foreign Pop Album
| 
| 
|-
! scope="row"|IM&MC Music Video Awards
| 1986
| "Take On Me"
| Best Videoclip
| 
| 
|-
! scope="row"|Japan Gold Disc Awards
| 1989
|Stay on These Roads
| International Album of the Year
|
| 
|-
!scope="row" rowspan=11|MTV Video Music Awards
| rowspan="11" | 1986
| rowspan="8" | "Take On Me"
| Video of the Year
|  
| rowspan=11|
|-
| Best Group Video
|  
|-
| Best New Artist                   
|  
|-
| Best Concept Video
|  
|-
| Most Experimental Video
|  
|-
| Best Direction 
|  
|-
| Best Special Effects
|  
|-
| Viewer's Choice
|  
|-
| rowspan="3" | "The Sun Always Shines on T.V."
| Best Art Direction 
|  
|-
| Best Editing 
| 
|-
| Best Cinematography 
|  
|-
!scope="row"|Nordic Music Awards
| 2004
| Themselves
| Prize of Honor
| 
| 
|-
! scope="row"|Norwegian Music Hall of Fame
| 2011
| Themselves
| Inducted 
| 
| 
|-
! scope="row"|Peer Gynt Prize
| 1987
| Themselves
| Peer Gynt Prize
| 
| 
|-
!scope="row"|Q Awards
| 2006
| Themselves
|  Q Inspiration Award
| 
| 
|-
!scope="row" rowspan=17|Spellemannprisen
| rowspan=2|1985
| rowspan=2|Hunting High and Low
| Spellemann of the Year
| 
| rowspan=17|
|-
| rowspan=2|Pop of the Year
| 
|-
| rowspan=3|1986
| Scoundrel Days
| 
|-
| "Hunting High and Low"
|Music Video of the Year
| 
|-
| Themselves
| Jury Honorary Award
| 
|-
| 1988
| Stay on These Roads
| rowspan=4|Pop of the Year
| 
|-
| 1990
| East of the Sun, West of the Moon
| 
|-
| 1993
| Memorial Beach
| 
|-
| rowspan=4|2000
| Minor Earth Major Sky
| 
|-
| "Summer Moved On"
| Song of the Year
| 
|-
| "Velvet"
| Music Video of the Year
| 
|-
| Themselves
| Honorary Award
| 
|-
| 2001
| "Take On Me"
| The Norwegian Hit of All Time
| 
|-
| rowspan=2|2002
| "Forever Not Yours"
| Song of the Year
| 
|-
| "Lifelines"
| Music Video of the Year
| 
|-
| 2010
| Themselves
| Honorary Award
| 
|-
| 2015
| Cast in Steel
| Pop Group of the Year
| 
|-
! scope="row" rowspan=3|Viña del Mar Festival
| rowspan=3|2006
| rowspan=3|Themselves
| Antorcha de Oro
| 
| rowspan=3|
|-
| Antorcha de Plata 
| 
|-
| Gaviota de Plata
| 
|-
! scope="row" rowspan=2|World Music Awards
| 1993
| rowspan=2|Themselves
| rowspan=2|World's Best Selling Scandinavian Artist
| 
| rowspan=2|
|-
| 2010
|

Goldene Europa Award

Smash Hits Poll Winners Party
The Smash Hits Poll Winners Party was an awards ceremony held annually by British magazine Smash Hits, and broadcast on BBC One. 

|-
| 1985
| rowspan=6|A-ha
| rowspan=3|Best Group
| 
|-
| 1986
| 
|-
| rowspan=2|1987
| 
|-
| rowspan=2|Worst Group
| 
|-
| rowspan=3|1988
| 
|-
| Best Group
| 
|-
| "Touchy!"
| Best Pop Video 
| 
|-
| 1986
| rowspan=6|Morten Harket (A-ha)
| rowspan=3|Best singer
|

Various other awards

References

External links
 Official website

Lists of awards received by Norwegian musician
Lists of awards received by musical group